United Nations Security Council resolution 572, adopted unanimously on 30 September 1985, after recalling Resolution 568 (1985) and noting a report from a mission to Botswana appointed by the Secretary-General, the Council endorsed the report regarding a South African attack on the country.

The resolution demanded compensation for Botswana, and requested international assistance from Member States and organisations for the country in the areas identified in the report. It also asked the Secretary-General to keep the situation under observation.

See also
 List of United Nations Security Council Resolutions 501 to 600 (1982–1987)
 South African Border Wars
 Apartheid

External links
 
Text of the Resolution at undocs.org

 0572
20th century in South Africa
1985 in South Africa
1985 in Africa
1985 in Botswana
 0572
 0572
September 1985 events
Botswana–South Africa relations